Xenuroturris gemmuloides is a species of sea snail, a marine gastropod mollusk in the family Turridae, the turrids.

Description

Distribution

References

Turridae
Gastropods described in 1967